Parashorea stellata (also called white seraya) is a species of tree in the family Dipterocarpaceae. It grows naturally in Laos, Peninsular Malaysia, Myanmar, Thailand, and Vietnam. It is threatened by habitat loss.

References

stellata
Flora of Indo-China
Flora of Peninsular Malaysia
Taxonomy articles created by Polbot